In probability and statistics, an urn problem is an idealized mental exercise in which some objects of real interest (such as atoms, people, cars, etc.) are represented as colored balls in an urn or other container. One pretends to remove one or more balls from the urn; the goal is to determine the probability of drawing one color or another, 
or some other properties. A number of important variations are described below.

An urn model is either a set of probabilities that describe events within an urn problem, or it is a probability distribution, or a family of such distributions, of random variables associated with urn problems.

History

In Ars Conjectandi (1713), Jacob Bernoulli considered the problem of determining, given a number of pebbles drawn from an urn, the proportions of different colored pebbles within the urn. This problem was known as the inverse probability problem, and was a topic of research in the eighteenth century, attracting the attention of Abraham de Moivre and Thomas Bayes.

Bernoulli used the Latin word urna, which primarily means a clay vessel, but is also the term used in ancient Rome for a vessel of any kind for collecting ballots or lots; the present-day Italian word for ballot box is still urna. Bernoulli's inspiration may have been lotteries, elections, or games of chance which involved drawing balls from a container, and it has been asserted that elections in medieval and renaissance Venice, including that of the doge, often included the choice of electors by lot, using balls of different colors drawn from an urn.

Basic urn model 

In this basic urn model in probability theory, the urn contains x white and y black balls, well-mixed together.  One ball is drawn randomly from the urn and its color observed; it is then placed back in the urn (or not), and the selection process is repeated.

Possible questions that can be answered in this model are:
 Can I infer the proportion of white and black balls from n observations? With what degree of confidence?
 Knowing x and y, what is the probability of drawing a specific sequence (e.g. one white followed by one black)?
 If I only observe n balls, how sure can I be that there are no black balls? (A variation both on the first and the second question)

Examples of urn problems

 beta-binomial distribution: as above, except that every time a ball is observed, an additional ball of the same color is added to the urn. Hence, the number of total balls in the urn grows. See Pólya urn model.
 binomial distribution: the distribution of the number of successful draws (trials), i.e. extraction of white balls, given n draws with replacement in an urn with black and white balls.
 Hoppe urn: a Pólya urn with an additional ball called the mutator. When the mutator is drawn it is replaced along with an additional ball of an entirely new colour.
 hypergeometric distribution: the balls are not returned to the urn once extracted. Hence, the number of total marbles in the urn decreases. This is referred to as "drawing without replacement", by opposition to "drawing with replacement".
 multivariate hypergeometric distribution: the balls are not returned to the urn once extracted, but with balls of more than two colors.
 geometric distribution: number of draws before the first successful (correctly colored) draw.
 Mixed replacement/non-replacement: the urn contains black and white balls. While black balls are set aside after a draw (non-replacement), white balls are returned to the urn after a draw (replacement). What is the distribution of the number of black balls drawn after m draws?
 multinomial distribution: there are balls of more than two colors. Each time a ball is extracted, it is returned before drawing another ball. This is also known as 'Balls into bins'.
 negative binomial distribution: number of draws before a certain number of failures (incorrectly colored draws) occurs.
 Occupancy problem: the distribution of the number of occupied urns after the random assignment of k balls into n urns, related to the coupon collector's problem and birthday problem.
 Pólya urn: each time a ball of a particular colour is drawn, it is replaced along with an additional ball of the same colour.
 Statistical physics: derivation of energy and velocity distributions.
 The Ellsberg paradox.

See also

 Balls into bins
 Coin-tossing problems
 Coupon collector's problem
 Dirichlet-multinomial distribution
 Noncentral hypergeometric distributions

References

Further reading
 Johnson, Norman L.; and Kotz, Samuel (1977); Urn Models and Their Application: An Approach to Modern Discrete Probability Theory, Wiley 
 Mahmoud, Hosam M. (2008); Pólya Urn Models, Chapman & Hall/CRC. 

Probability problems
Thought experiments